George William Prout (3 November 1902 – 1960) was an English professional footballer who played as a goalkeeper.

References

1902 births
1960 deaths
People from Dalton-in-Furness
English footballers
Association football goalkeepers
Dalton Casuals F.C. players
Preston North End F.C. players
Grimsby Town F.C. players
Carlisle United F.C. players
Bath City F.C. players
Cheltenham Town F.C. players
English Football League players
Footballers from Cumbria